Jackie Hennessy was an Irish footballer who played with St. Patrick's Athletic, Shelbourne and Derry City during his career. He also earned 5 international call-ups to the Republic of Ireland team, debuting during the 1965-66 League of Ireland season against West Germany. In 1960, he scored twice on his only Republic of Ireland B appearance. In 1962 Hennessy scored Shelbourne's first ever goal in European Competition in the 1962-63 European Cup against Sporting CP.

References

St Patrick's Athletic F.C. players
Derry City F.C. players
Shelbourne F.C. players
Republic of Ireland association footballers
League of Ireland players
League of Ireland XI players
Republic of Ireland international footballers
Republic of Ireland B international footballers
Living people
1940 births
Association football utility players